The calendar for the 2022–2023 men's cyclo-cross season includes cyclo-cross races starting on 13 August 2022, and ending in February 2023. The individual events are classified into five categories. The highest category includes the world cup events (CDM), which gives rise to a ranking. Behind them, we find the C1 and C2 category races, which award points are for the world ranking, then the races reserved for those under 23, also called hopes (category CU) and finally the races for juniors (category CJ) . There are also national championships (NC) which are organized in about thirty countries.

Men

September

October

November

December

January

February

2022–23 UCI Cyclo-cross World Cup

National Cups

2022 AusCycling CX National Series

Austrian Cyclocross Cup 2022–23

Belgian Cyclocross Cup 2022–23

Croatian Mini Cyclocross Cup 2022–23

Czech Cyclocross Cup 2022

Danish Cyclocross Cup 2022–2023

Estonian Cyclocross Cup 2022–23

Finnish Cyclocross Cup 2022

2022 Coupe de France Cyclo-cross

Bikebeat German Bundesliga CycloCross 2022/23

2022–23 British National Trophy Series

2022 Cyclo-cross Magyar Kupa

2022 Irish Cyclocross National Series

2022 Giro d'Italia Cross

2022 Lithuanian Velo CX Cup

ŠKODA Coupe de Louxembourg Cyclo-cross 2022–23

NorgesCup CX Cup 2022

Netherlands Cyclocross Cup 2022

Puchar Polski CX 2022

Taça de Portugal de Ciclocrosse 2022–23

Cupa Națională de Ciclocros a României 2022

Slovak Cyclocross Cup 2022

Pokal Slovenije v ciklokrosu 2022–2023

Copa de España de Ciclocross 2022

2022 Swedish National Cyclocross Cup

Swiss Ciclocross Cup 2022-2023



Number of wins

Women

September

October

November

December

January

February

2022–23 UCI Cyclo-cross World Cup

2023 UCI Cyclo-cross World Championships

National Cups

2022 AusCycling CX National Series

Austrian Cyclocross Cup 2022–23

Belgian Cyclocross Cup 2022–23

Czech Cyclocross Cup 2022–23

Danish Cyclocross Cup 2022–2023

Estonian Cyclocross Cup 2022–23

Finnish Cyclocross Cup 2022

2022–23 Coupe de France Cyclo-cross

Bikebeat German Bundesliga CycloCross 2022/23

2022–23 British National Trophy Series

2022 Cyclo-cross Magyar Kupa

2022 Irish Cyclocross National Series

2022 Giro d'Italia Cross

2022 Lithuanian Velo CX Cup

ŠKODA Coupe de Louxembourg Cyclo-cross 2022–23

NorgesCup CX Cup 2022

Netherlands Cyclocross Cup 2022

Puchar Polski CX 2022

Taça de Portugal de Ciclocrosse 2022–23

Cupa Națională de Ciclocros a României 2022

Slovak Cyclocross Cup 2022

Pokal Slovenije v ciklokrosu 2022–2023

Copa de España de Ciclocross 2022-2023

2022 Swedish National Cyclocross Cup

Swiss Ciclocross Cup 2022-2023



Number of wins

2022–23 UCI Cyclo-cross World Cup Standings

General classification

Points accumulated

Men's Elite General classification 

Europe

Austrian Cyclocross Cup 2022–23

2022–23 Superprestige

Czech Cyclocross Cup 2022

Danish Cyclocross Cup 2022–2023

Estonian Cyclocross Cup 2022

2022 Coupe de France Cyclocross

Bikebeat German Bundesliga CycloCross 2022/23

British National Trophy Series 2022-2023

2022 Irish National Cyclocross Series

Islandic CX Cup 2022

2022 Giro d'Italia Cross

ŠKODA Coupe de Louxembourg Cyclo-cross 2022–23

Norges CX Cup 2022

Puchar Polski CX 2022

Taça de Portugal de Ciclocrosse 2022

Cupa Națională de Ciclocros a României 2022

Slovak Cyclocross Cup 2022

Copa de España de Ciclocross 2022-2023

2022 Swedish National Cyclocross Cup

Swiss Ciclocross Cup 2022-2023

USCX Cyclocross Series 2022

Women's Elite General classification 

Europe

Austrian Cyclocross Cup 2022–23

2022–23 Superprestige

Czech Cyclocross Cup 2022

Danish Cyclocross Cup 2022–2023

Estonian Cyclocross Cup 2022

2022 Coupe de France Cyclo-cross

Bikebeat German Bundesliga CycloCross 2022/23

British National Trophy Series 2022-2023

2022 Irish Cyclocross National Series

Islandic CX Cup 2022

2022 Giro d'Italia Cross

ŠKODA Coupe de Louxembourg Cyclo-cross 2022–23

Norges CX Cup 2022

Puchar Polski CX 2022

Taça de Portugal de Ciclocrosse 2022

Cupa Națională de Ciclocros a României 2022

Slovenský pohár v cyklokrose 2022

Copa de España de Ciclocross 2022

2022 Swedish National Cyclocross Cup

Swiss Ciclocross Cup 2022-2023

USCX Cyclocross Series 2022

National Championships (NC)

References

UCI Cyclo-cross World Cup
season
season
Cyclo-cross